Eerik Jago (born 29 December 1980) is an Estonian volleyball player.

He was born in Tallinn. In 2013 he graduated from Turku polytechnical school.

He started his volleyball exercising in 1991. He was coached by Andres Toode, Andres Skuin, Pasi Rautio, Avo Keel, Andrei Ojamets. 2000–2011 he was a member of Estonia men's national volleyball team. He has played in Finnish, Belgium, Dutch, Italian and Austrian clubs.

In 2005 he was named as Best Male Volleyball Player of Estonia.

Estonian national team
As a member of the senior Estonia men's national volleyball team, Jago competed at the 2009 and the 2011 Men's European Volleyball Championship.

Sporting achievements

Clubs
MEVZA Cup
  2009/2010 - with Hypo Tirol Innsbruck

National championship
 2003/2004  Finnish Championship, with Salon Piivolley
 2005/2006  Dutch Championship, with Piet Zoomers Apeldoorn
 2009/2010  Austrian Championship, with Hypo Tirol Innsbruck
 2012/2013  Finnish Championship, with Hurrikaani Loimaa

National cup
 2000/2001  Finnish Cup, with Rocks Helsinki
 2003/2004  Finnish Cup, with Salon Piivolley

Individual
 2004 Finnish League – All-Star
 2004 Finnish League – Most Valuable Player
 2005 Estonian Volleyball Player of the Year

References

External links

Living people
1980 births
Estonian men's volleyball players
Sportspeople from Tallinn
Estonian expatriate volleyball players
Estonian expatriate sportspeople in Finland
Expatriate volleyball players in Finland
Estonian expatriate sportspeople in Belgium
Expatriate volleyball players in Belgium
Estonian expatriate sportspeople in the Netherlands
Expatriate volleyball players in the Netherlands
Estonian expatriate sportspeople in Italy
Expatriate volleyball players in Italy
Estonian expatriate sportspeople in Austria
Expatriate volleyball players in Austria